District 6 is a district in the Texas House of Representatives that encompasses most of Smith County. The district is currently represented by Republican Matt Schaefer. 

Tyler is the most populous city in the district.

List of representatives

References

006
Smith County, Texas